The Golden Jubilee of Queen Victoria was celebrated on 20 and 21 June 1887 to mark the 50th anniversary of Queen Victoria's accession on 20 June 1837. It was celebrated with a Thanksgiving Service at Westminster Abbey, and a banquet to which 50 European kings and princes were invited.

Background

As the fiftieth anniversary of Victoria's accession approached, public anticipation of national celebrations began to grow, encouraged by the Liberal politician, Lord Granville. At the previous royal jubilee, the Golden Jubilee of George III, the king had been ill at Windsor Castle, so there was little precedent to follow. In 1872, the recovery of Edward, Prince of Wales from a bout of typhoid fever was marked by Victoria processing through London to a thanksgiving service at St Paul's Cathedral; despite the queen's reluctance, this had proved to be a resounding success which had silenced the many critics of the monarchy. For the Golden Jubilee, Victoria had informed the Conservative prime minister, Lord Salisbury, that she intended to have a thanksgiving service at Westminster Abbey, and ignoring the Biblical tradition that the start of the fiftieth year should be celebrated, the jubilee should mark the completion of fifty years. The service should reference Victoria's coronation, although the queen would not wear a crown or robes of state. This entailed considerable alterations inside the Abbey, which Lord Salisbury reluctantly agreed to finance, but he insisted that the queen should underwrite the rest of the costs.

The Queen's Jubilee message
On the occasion of her Golden Jubilee, Queen Victoria wrote a message of thanks to her people, which was then published in the London Gazette and national newspapers:

Celebrations

India

The first official Golden Jubilee celebrations were in the Indian Empire, and began in February to avoid the summer heat. Events took place across India on Jubilee Day, 16 February, orchestrated by the Viceroy, Lord Lytton, although his attempts to link the event with the perceived success of the British administration were mostly ignored by local rulers. A durbar in Bombay (now Mumbai) was attended by Prince Arthur, Duke of Connaught. Additionally, Victoria had a contingent of cavalry from the British Indian Army brought to London to be her personal escort, and engaged two Indian Muslims as waiters, one of whom was Abdul Karim. Invitations to the jubilee celebrations were extended to the rulers of the Indian Princely States, several of whom were willing to make the lengthy journey.

20 June
On 20 June 1887, the Queen had breakfast outdoors under the trees at Frogmore, where Prince Albert had been buried. She wrote in her diary:

She then travelled by train from Windsor station to Paddington then to Buckingham Palace for a lunch. In the evening, there was a banquet, which fifty foreign kings and princes, along with the governing heads of Britain's overseas colonies and dominions, attended. She wrote in her diary:

21 June

The next day, the Queen participated in a procession in an open landau, drawn by six cream-coloured horses, through London to Westminster Abbey escorted by Colonial Indian cavalry. She refused to wear a crown, wearing instead a bonnet and a long dress. The procession through London, according to Mark Twain, "stretched to the limit of sight in both directions". The spectators were accommodated on terraced benches along 10 miles of scaffolding erected for the purpose.

At Westminster Abbey, there was a Service of Thanksgiving held for the Queen's reign. During the Service, a beam of sunlight fell upon her bowed head, which the future Queen Liliuokalani of Hawaii observing noted as a mark of divine favour.

On her return to the Palace, she went to her balcony and was cheered by the crowd. In the ballroom she distributed brooches made for the Jubilee to her family. In the evening, she put on a gown embroidered with silver roses, thistles and shamrocks and attended a banquet. Afterwards she received a procession of diplomats and Indian princes. She was then wheeled in her chair to sit and watch fireworks in the palace garden.

The Queen reflected on the day in her diary:

22 June

The next morning, Victoria went to St James's Palace to visit her elderly great-aunt, the dowager Duchess of Cambridge. In the afternoon, the Queen attended a party in Hyde Park for 26,000 schoolchildren, who were all given a glass of milk, a bun and a Jubilee mug. Returning to Windsor by train, the Queen then unveiled a bronze statue of herself in Castle Hill by Sir Edgar Boehm, before viewing a torchlight procession by the schoolboys of Eton College.

Aldershot review
On 9 July, Victoria and other members of the royal family attended a Jubilee Field State Review of the British Army at Aldershot. The total number of troops participating was over 58,000; including 21,200 regular soldiers, 4,500 Militia, 270 Yeomanry and 33,000 Volunteers. The Queen, with an escort of the 10th Royal Hussars in which Prince Albert Victor was serving, received an address by the Commander-in-Chief of the Forces, Prince George, Duke of Cambridge, and then watched the entire force march past in review. Although the ground had been watered that morning by two traction engines, the passing of so many boots and hooves threw up great clouds of dust, to the annoyance of the huge crowd of spectators. Following lunch in a specially erected pavilion, the Queen returned to Windsor by train.

Spithead review

On 23 July, Victoria and the royal family attended a Jubilee Fleet Review at Spithead offshore from Portsmouth. Present were more than one hundred Royal Navy warships and dozens of other vessels. The British fleet included 26 ironclads, 14 cruisers, 31 gunboats and 38 torpedo boats; between them these ships carried 442 guns and were manned by 16,136 officers and ratings. Also present were several foreign warships, as well as troopships, large merchant ships, yachts and numerous small craft filled with spectators. The Queen and other important guests passed along the lines of anchored ships in a flotilla led by the royal yacht, . That night, the ships were illuminated by their searchlights. A report for the United States Navy described the review as "the most imposing ever seen afloat".

Other events

At the Jubilee, the Queen engaged two Indian Muslims as waiters, one of whom was Abdul Karim.

A commemorative bust of Victoria was commissioned from the sculptor Francis John Williamson. Many copies were made, and distributed throughout the British Empire.

A special Golden Jubilee Medal was instituted and awarded to participants of the jubilee celebrations.

Writer and geographer John Francon Williams published The Jubilee Atlas of the British Empire especially to commemorate Victoria's Jubilee and her Jubilee year.

Many British towns and cities commissioned new monuments, public clocks or buildings to mark the event, including Queen's Arcade in Leeds, the Jubilee Memorial, Harrogate, the Jubilee Clock Tower, Weymouth, the Jubilee Clock Tower, Brighton and the Clock Tower, Crewe.

Gallery

Royal guests at the Jubilee celebrations

British royal family
 The Queen of the United Kingdom
  The German Crown Princess and Crown Prince, the Queen's daughter and son-in-law (representing the German Emperor)
  Prince and Princess Wilhelm of Prussia, the Queen's grandson and granddaughter-in-law
  The Hereditary Princess and Hereditary Prince of Saxe-Meiningen, the Queen's granddaughter and grandson-in-law (representing the Duke of Saxe-Meiningen)
  Princess Feodora of Saxe-Meiningen, the Queen's great-granddaughter
  Prince Henry of Prussia, the Queen's grandson
  Princess Viktoria of Prussia, the Queen's granddaughter
  Princess Sophia of Prussia, the Queen's granddaughter
  Princess Margaret of Prussia, the Queen's granddaughter
 The Prince and Princess of Wales, the Queen's son and daughter-in-law
 Prince Albert Victor of Wales, the Queen's grandson
 Prince George of Wales, the Queen's grandson
 Princess Louise of Wales, the Queen's granddaughter
 Princess Victoria of Wales, the Queen's granddaughter
 Princess Maud of Wales, the Queen's granddaughter
  The Grand Duke of Hesse and by Rhine, the Queen's son-in-law
 Princess and Prince Louis of Battenberg, the Queen's granddaughter and grandson-in-law
  Grand Duchess Elizabeth Feodorovna and Grand Duke Sergei Alexandrovich of Russia, the Queen's granddaughter and grandson-in-law (representing the Emperor of Russia)
  Princess Irene of Hesse and by Rhine, the Queen's granddaughter
  The Hereditary Grand Duke of Hesse and by Rhine, the Queen's grandson
  Princess Alix of Hesse and by Rhine, the Queen's granddaughter
 The Duke and Duchess of Edinburgh, the Queen's son and daughter-in-law
 Prince Alfred of Edinburgh, the Queen's grandson
 Princess Marie of Edinburgh, the Queen's granddaughter
 Princess Victoria Melita of Edinburgh, the Queen's granddaughter
 Princess Alexandra of Edinburgh, the Queen's granddaughter
 Princess and Prince Christian of Schleswig-Holstein, the Queen's daughter and son-in-law
 Prince Christian Victor of Schleswig-Holstein, the Queen's grandson
 Prince Albert of Schleswig-Holstein, the Queen's grandson
 Princess Helena Victoria of Schleswig-Holstein, the Queen's granddaughter
 Princess Marie Louise of Schleswig-Holstein, the Queen's granddaughter
 The Princess Louise, Marchioness of Lorne and Marquess of Lorne, the Queen's daughter and son-in-law
 The Duke and Duchess of Connaught and Strathearn, the Queen's son and daughter-in-law
 Princess Margaret of Connaught, the Queen's granddaughter
 Prince Arthur of Connaught, the Queen's grandson
 The Duchess of Albany, the Queen's daughter-in-law
 Princess and Prince Henry of Battenberg, the Queen's daughter and son-in-law
 Prince Alexander of Battenberg, the Queen's grandson
Other descendants of the Queen's paternal grandfather, King George III and their families:
 The Duke of Cambridge, the Queen's first cousin
 George FitzGeorge, the Queen's first cousin once removed
 Augustus FitzGeorge, the Queen's first cousin once removed
  The Grand Duchess and Grand Duke of Mecklenburg-Strelitz, the Queen's first cousin and her husband
  The Hereditary Grand Duke and Hereditary Grand Duchess of Mecklenburg-Strelitz, the Queen's first cousin once removed and his wife
 The Duchess and Duke of Teck, the Queen's first cousin and her husband
 Princess Victoria Mary of Teck, the Queen's first cousin once removed
 Prince Adolphus of Teck, the Queen's first cousin once removed
 Prince Francis of Teck, the Queen's first cousin once removed
 Prince Alexander of Teck, the Queen's first cousin once removed
 Princess Frederica of Hanover and Baron Alphons von Pawel-Rammingen, the Queen's first cousin once removed and her husband
 The Hon. Aubrey FitzClarence, the Queen's first cousin twice removed (and great-grandson of King William IV)

Foreign royals

 The Prince and Princess of Leiningen, the Queen's half-nephew and half-niece-in-law
 Princess Alberta of Leiningen, the Queen's half-great-niece
 The Prince of Hohenlohe-Langenburg, the Queen's half-nephew
 Prince and Princess Victor of Hohenlohe-Langenburg, the Queen's half-nephew and half-niece-in-law
 Countess Feodora Gleichen, the Queen's half-great-niece
 Count Edward Gleichen, the Queen's half-great-nephew
 Countess Victoria Gleichen, the Queen's half-great-niece
  Prince Ernst of Saxe-Meiningen, the Queen's half-great-nephew
  The Duke of Saxe-Coburg and Gotha, the Queen's brother-in-law and first cousin
  The King and Queen of the Belgians, the Queen's first cousin and his wife
  Princess and Prince Philipp of Saxe-Coburg and Gotha, the Queen's first cousins once removed
  The Crown Prince of Austria-Hungary, husband of the Queen's first cousin once removed (representing the Emperor of Austria)
  The Crown Prince and Crown Princess of Portugal, the Queen's first cousin twice removed and his wife (representing the King of Portugal)
  The King of Denmark, father of the Princess of Wales
  The King of the Hellenes, brother of the Princess of Wales
  The Duke of Sparta, nephew of the Princess of Wales
  Prince George of Greece and Denmark, nephew of the Princess of Wales
  Prince Ludwig of Baden, nephew of the German Crown Prince (representing the Grand Duke of Baden)
  The Crown Prince of Sweden and Norway, nephew-in-law of the German Crown Prince (representing the King of Sweden and Norway)
  The King of Saxony
  The Duke of Aosta (representing the King of Italy)
  Infante Antonio and Infanta Eulalia of Spain (representing the Queen Regent of Spain)
  Ke Aliʻi wahine o ko Hawaiʻi Pae ʻAina (The Queen of the Hawaiian Islands)
  Crown Princess Liliʻuokalani of Hawaii (sister and heir apparent of Ke Aliʻi (king) Kalakaua)
  Prince Ludwig of Bavaria (representing the Prince Regent of Bavaria)
  The Hereditary Grand Duke of Saxe-Weimar-Eisenach (representing the Grand Duke of Saxe-Weimar-Eisenach)
  Prince and Princess Edward of Saxe-Weimar
  Prince Hermann of Saxe-Weimar-Eisenach
  Prince Komatsu Akihito (representing the Emperor of Japan)
  Prince Devawongse Varoprakar of Siam (representing the King of Siam)
  Prince Abu 'n Nasr Mirza Hissam us Sultaneh of Persia (representing the Shah of Persia)
  The Hereditary Prince of Anhalt (representing the Duke of Anhalt)
  Nawab Sir Asman Jah representing Asaf Jah VI Mahboob Ali Khan, Nizam of Hyderabad and Berar. 
 The Maharaja of Gondal
 The Thakore Sahib of Liinri
 The Thakore Sahib of Morvi
 The Maharaja and Maharani of Coochbehar 
The Maharajah of Darbhanga
 The Maharaja of Kutch
 The Maharaja Holkar of Indore
 The Count and Countess of Paris
 The Duke of Orléans
 Princess Hélène of Orléans
 The Duke of Chartres
 Prince Henri of Orléans
 Princess Marguerite d'Orléans
 The Duke of Aumale

See also

 Queen Victoria Golden Jubilee Medal
 1887 Golden Jubilee Honours

Notes

References

Bibliography 
 
 Hibbert, Christopher (2000) Queen Victoria: A Personal History, London: HarperCollins, 
 St Aubyn, Giles (1991) Queen Victoria: A Portrait, London: Sinclair-Stevenson, 
 
 Waller, Maureen (2006) Sovereign Ladies: The Six Reigning Queens of England, London: John Murray, 
 

1887 in Canada
1887 in the United Kingdom
Monarchy in Canada
Queen Victoria
Golden jubilees
British royal jubilees
June 1887 events
Leeds Blue Plaques